Nyyssönen is a Finnish surname. Notable people with the surname include:

 Artturi Nyyssönen (1892–1973), Finnish footballer
 Harri Nyyssönen (born 1965), Finnish footballer
 Kai Nyyssönen (born 1972), Finnish footballer

Finnish-language surnames